Carl Alexander Heideloff (2 February 1789 – 28 September 1865), also known as Karl Alexander von Heideloff, was a German architect, and master builder of Nuremberg. He is also known for his restoration of buildings and monuments.

Life
Born in Stuttgart, he was son of the painter Victor Peter Heideloff. Heideloff initially studied at the Stuttgart Academy of Arts, then spent five years working as an architect in Coburg.

In 1818 he was appointed as the city architect for Nuremberg, and in 1822 he became a professor of architecture at the polytechnic school there, a post he held until 1854. During this time he was also chosen as conservator of artistic monuments.

Heideloff principally worked in the Gothic style of architecture, and the buildings restored and erected by him at Nuremberg and in its neighborhood attest to both his original skill and his purity of taste. He also achieved some success as a painter of watercolours. Heideloff died at Hassfurt in 1865.

Noted work
 Restoration of Nuremberg Castle, 1834–35
 Restoration of Coburg Village, 1838–1844
 Lichtenstein Castle, 1840
 Reinhardsbrunn Castle
 The Hall of the Knights in the fortress at Coburg
 Landsberg castle
 The mortuary chapel in Meiningen
 Rosenburg Castle near Bonn
 The chapel of Rheinstein Castle
 Catholic church in Leipzig
 Restoration of Bamberg Cathedral
 Restoration of the Knights Chapel (Ritter Kapelle) at Hassfurt
 Restoration of the St. Aegidien Church at Oschatz, 1846-1849

Literary work
Die Lehre von den Säulenordnungen (1827)
Die architektonischen Glieder, deren Konstruktion, Zusammenstellung und Verzierung (1831) 2 volumes
Der Kleine Vignola (1832)
Nürnbergs Baudenkmäler der Vorzeit (1838-1843), (complete edition 1854) - 'Nuremberg's architectural monuments of the Vorzeit'
Die Ornamentik des Mittelalters (1838-1842) 24 volumes - 'The Ornamental art of the Middle Ages'

References

1789 births
1865 deaths
19th-century German architects
Architects from Stuttgart
19th-century German educators